Udayanraje Bhosale (born 24 February 1966) is an Indian politician serving as a member of the Rajya Sabha, the upper house of the Parliament of India, from Maharashtra since 2020. He is a member of the Bharatiya Janata Party.

Bhosale is the 17th holder of the title of Chhatrapati which was founded by the Maratha emperor, Chhatrapati Shivaji Maharaj on his coronation in 1674.

He is addressed as Chhatrapati by some in the media, however the title is entirely ceremonial and in the role of a pretender.

Personal life
Bhosale was born in Nashik to Pratapsingh and Kalpanaraje. He studied Production Engineering. He married Damayantiraje on 20 November 2003. They have a son and a daughter.

Political career

Bhosale was a member of Bharatiya Janata Party and a member of the Maharashtra Legislative Assembly (1998-1999) and the Minister for Revenue of Maharashtra in the Sena-BJP Maharashtra government. In 2009, 2014 and 2019 parliamentary elections he was elected to the Lok Sabha as a Nationalist Congress Party candidate from Satara (Lok Sabha constituency). In September 2019, he resigned from NCP and announced his return from NCP to the BJP ahead of the Maharashtra legislative assembly elections. He lost the Lok Sabha by-poll in October 2019. In 2020 he was elected to Rajya Sabha from Maharashtra.

References

External links
 Fifteenth Lok Sabha Members Bioprofile - Bhosale, Shri Udayanraje Pratapsingh

India MPs 2009–2014
Maharajas of Maharashtra
Living people
1966 births
Maharashtra politicians
Bharatiya Janata Party politicians from Maharashtra
Nationalist Congress Party politicians from Maharashtra
Members of the Maharashtra Legislative Assembly
Lok Sabha members from Maharashtra
India MPs 2014–2019